The SuperFinał (more commonly known as the Polish Bowl) is the championship game of the Polish American Football League (PLFA). The first Polish Bowl played on November 12, 2006 in Warsaw at the Marymont stadium between top two teams in regular season. Since 2007 in the Polish Bowl game is played between Semi-Final winners.

As the Super Bowl, the Polish Bowl uses Roman numerals to identify each game, rather than the year in which it is held. For example, Polish Bowl I was played in 2006, while Polish Bowl VII played on July 15, 2012, to determine the champion of the 2012 regular season.

Since 2011 (Polish Bowl VI), official name of the Polish Bowl is SuperFinał, formerly the PLFA Finał.

After 2017 some teams separated from PLFA into newly formed league Liga Futbolu Amerykańskiego, so in 2018 both competitions held finals, referred as Polish Bowl XIII. In 2019 the PLFA ended after the regular season and the planned post-season including Polish Bowl was not held. The PLFA dissolved after the season.

In 2020 the LFA final was postponed because of the Covid-19 pandemic, played in November behind closed doors. In 2021 7 former PLFA and LFA teams merged under the newly formed Polish football association ZFAP.

Polish Bowl games

PLFA

LFA

PFL

Appearances teams 
In the sortable table below, teams are ordered first by number of appearances, then by number of wins, and finally by year of first appearance. In the "Season(s)" column, bold years indicate winning seasons, and italic years indicate games not yet played.

Rematches 
The following teams have faced each other more than once in the Polish Bowl:
 Warsaw Eagles and Seahawks Gdynia (formerly Pomorze Seahawks); game I, III and VII (first two won by Warsaw, third won by Gdynia)
 The Crew Wrocław (later Giants) and Silesia Miners (now Rebels); game II and IV (first won by Wrocław, second won by Silesia)
 The Crew Wrocław (later Giants) and Devils Wrocław; game V and VI (first won by Devils, second by The Crew)

Venue 
Five of eight Polish Bowls have been played in Warsaw (three at the RKS Marymont stadium and the last two at National Stadium). Two games have been played in Wrocław at the Olympic Stadium and the Niskie Łąki stadium. One game was played in Bielawa at the Bielawianka stadium.

See also 
 Polish American Football League
 Liga Futbolu Amerykańskiego
 Polish Football League

References

External links 
 Polish American Football Association

Polish American Football League
American football bowls in Europe